Bonarg (also Romanized as Bonrak and Bownark; also known as Būnzak) is a village in Nimbeluk Rural District, Nimbeluk District, Qaen County, South Khorasan Province, Iran. At the 2006 census, its population was 81, in 31 families.

References 

Populated places in Qaen County